The Azerbaijan national basketball team is the national basketball team of Azerbaijan. The team is controlled by the Azerbaijan Basketball Federation. 

Azerbaijan has been a FIBA member since 1994, although they have not fielded a senior national team in any competition in over five years.

Current roster

Competitive record

Achievements
Championship for Small Countries
Champions: 2006, 2008
Fourth place: 2004
Basketball at the Islamic Solidarity GamesChampions': 2005

Past rosters
2012:

Coach: Samit Nuruzade

See also

Sport in Azerbaijan
Azerbaijan women's national basketball team

References

External links
Official website 
Azerbaijan at FIBA site
Azerbaijan National Team - Men at Eurobasket.com

Azerbaijan
Azerbaijan national basketball team
1994 establishments in Azerbaijan